Lee Moon-shuen (4 February 1901 – 7 February 1965) known professionally as Lee Hoi-chuen, was a Chinese opera singer and film actor in Hong Kong. He was the father of Bruce Lee, the father-in-law of Linda Lee Cadwell, and the paternal grandfather of Brandon Lee and Shannon Lee.

Family

Lee Hoi-chuen was born in Jun'an, Guangdong, Qing China on 4 February 1901. He moved to British Hong Kong and became a Cantonese opera actor. There, he met and married Grace Ho (1907–1996) who was of half-Cantonese and half-English descent and a daughter of Ho Kom Tong. They had two daughters, Phoebe and Agnes, and three sons, Peter, Bruce and Robert.

Lee and his wife were on a one-year US tour with the Cantonese Opera Company in 1940 when their second son Bruce Lee was born in San Francisco. They later returned to Hong Kong when Bruce Lee was three months old. Soon after, the Lee family led an unexpected four-year hard life as Japan, in the midst of World War II, launched a surprise attack of Hong Kong in December 1941 and ruled for four years.

Their youngest son Robert Lee, who was born in 1948, would go on to become famous in Hong Kong during the 1960s as the lead singer and founder of a popular beat band, The Thunderbirds.

Lee died of a heart attack in Hong Kong on 7 February 1965, three days after his 64th birthday and six days after the birth of his grandson Brandon Lee. He was buried at St Raphael's Catholic Cemetery at Cheung Sha Wan in Kowloon.

In popular culture
Lee Hoi-chuen was portrayed by Ric Young in the 1993 film Dragon: The Bruce Lee Story and by Tony Leung Ka-fai in the 2010 film Bruce Lee, My Brother.

References

External links

Bruce Lee:The Divine Wind Bio

1901 births
1965 deaths
Hong Kong male Cantonese opera actors
Hong Kong male film actors
People from Foshan
Male actors from Guangdong
Singers from Guangdong
20th-century Hong Kong male actors
20th-century Hong Kong male singers
20th-century Chinese male actors
Family of Bruce Lee
Chinese emigrants to British Hong Kong